Ssuuna II Kalema Kasinjo Mukaabya Sekkyungwa Muteesa Sewankambo Walugembe Mig'ekyaamye Lukeberwa Kyetutumula Magulunyondo Luwambya Omutanda Sseggwanga was Kabaka of the Kingdom of Buganda from 1832 until 1856. He was the twenty-ninth Kabaka of Buganda.

Claim to the throne
He was born at Bujuuko Hill around 1820. He was the son of Kabaka Kamaanya Kadduwamala, Kabaka of Buganda, who reigned between 1814 and 1832. His mother was Nakkazi Kannyange, the twenty-third of his father's thirty-eight wives. 

He ascended to the throne upon the death of his father in 1832, having executed all his brothers in order to remain as the sole heir.

He established his capital on Mulago Hill.

Married life
Kabaka Ssuuna II continued in the tradition started by his grandfather and copied by his father; the practice of marrying an extraordinary number of wives. Ssuuna II outdid all of them. He is reported to have married one hundred forty eight wives.

Issue
As expected, the Kabaka having married 148 wives, he fathered a large number of children. Written accounts put the number as high as two hundred and twenty-one. 

 Prince (Omulangira) Kajumba
 Prince (Omulangira) Kiyimba, whose mother was Lady Zawedde
 Princess (Omumbejja) Nassuuna, whose mother was Lady Zawedde
 Prince (Omulangira) Mukaabya Walugembe, whose mother was Lady Muganzirwazza 

This reference lists the names of all of them, giving the names of their mothers in most cases.

Reign
Kabaka Ssuuna was only twelve 12 years when he ascended to the throne. He was a handsome boy, taking after the looks of his mother, Nakkazi Kannyange, reportedly one of the most beautiful women in Buganda at the time. He began as a popular monarch, loved by his people.

However, as he grew more confident, he became cocky and ruthless. He gave himself a string of names that implied invincibility and super-normal powers. He ordered the execution of fifty eight of his sixty brothers. Only two escaped the carnage:

 Prince (Omulangira) Wasajja, whose mother was Nakkazi of the Mamba clan (not Nakkazi Kannyange)
 Prince (Omulangira) Mugogo, whose mother was Kyotowadde of the Mamba clan

By the time of his death Kabaka Ssuuna II turned out to be one of the most ruthless of the Buganda kings.

Ssuuna continued the Buganda's trade in ivory and slaves with Zanzibar and for a time allowed foreign traders mainly Zanzibaris and Arabs like Snay bin Amir (in 1852) and Ahmed bin Ibrahim (in 1844), in his kingdom. He eventually banned entry of all foreign traders in Buganda.

Ssuuna increased Buganda's naval fleet and expansion in Lake Nnalubaale.

The wars of conquest against the Kingdom's neighbors continued during his reign which led to an expansion of the territory of the Buganda Kingdom.

During his reign, the neglect of sanitary standards within the capital was decreed an offence punishable by death. Ssuuna put a number of persons to death for breach of his rules, which aroused the ire of a certain medium named Kigemuzi. Kigemuzi began to speak disrespectfully of the King, saying that he did so by order of the gods. On Ssuuna's orders, Kigemuzi  was arrested and taken to the capital, contrary to the custom. He protested before the Kabaka, reminding him it was contrary to custom to bind a medicine-man or a medium. The King then ordered Kigemuzi to be removed, and that night the royal house was struck by lightning, and the King was scorched on his face and on one side of his body. Ssuuna at once sent for the medium Kigemuzi, released him, and asked him why there had been this storm. The medium answered: "Because the god of thunder (Kiwanuka) is angry at what you have done to me." The King then presented the man with cattle to make atonement for binding him, and the King's mother settled him on a large tract of land, in order to propitiate the gods, and to save her son from further harm.

Final years
In his final years, Kabaka Ssuuna sent an emissary to the king of Buzongola. On his return, the emissary delivered a less than flattering message from Buzongola. Ssuuna took this as a slight and waged war against the kingdom of Buzongola. The Katikiro, Kayira, the Kabaka's great chiefs and the Queen mother all advised against embarking on a military campaign in a time of famine and small pox. The Kabaka proceeded with the ill advised war.

Despite emerging victorious and driving out the king of Buzongola, the combined effects of war, small pox and famine greatly weakened his armies and most of his men died before reaching Buganda. Kabaka Ssuuna II died of small pox on his way back to Buganda in October 1856. Kayiira brought his remains back to Nabulagala. His remains are currently buried at Wamala.

Quotes
"He was a very cruel man: he was brave in war, he was a hunter of wild animals and very fond of hunting dogs. At times, however, he was kind, so they say, and it is well known that cruel kings at times exercise kindness so that they shall not be hated by their subjects. Such was Ssuuna."
 Ham Mukasa, "Some Notes on the Reign of Mutesa", 1934

"When he was reprimanded by Ahmed bin Ibrahim (the first Arab to visit Ssuuna II's court in 1844) over the wanton killing of his subjects, Ssuuna filed the following defence; 'I have no other secret for keeping my subjects in awe of me and in preventing conspiracies'."
 John A. Rowe, Revolution in Buganda, 1968

Wamala tombs
Set on a hilltop with beautiful surroundings, Wamala is the sacred burial place of Kabaka Ssuuna II, who had 148 wives and 218 children. Ssuuna II was the last Kabaka to be buried in his own palace and the last to have his jaw bone removed after death. He was also the first Kabaka to admit outside traders into Buganda. A magical but almost forgotten place, Wamala Tombs is quite unique.  It is a thirty-minute drive from Kampala along Kampala-Hoima Road. It is located on a hilltop about  after the right turn, off Hoima Road.

Succession table

See also
 Kabaka of Buganda
 Mulago Hill

References

External links
 List of Kings of Buganda

Kabakas of Buganda
19th-century monarchs in Africa
1856 deaths
1820 births
Deaths from smallpox